A Bulk insert is a process or method provided by a database management system to load multiple rows of data into a database table.

Bulk insert may refer to:

 Transact-SQL BULK INSERT statement 
 PL/SQL BULK COLLECT and FORALL statements
 MySQL LOAD DATA INFILE statement